Shamsh Kassim-Lakha' is a Pakistani businessman, politician, and educational leader. Under the vision of His Highness the Aga Khan, as Executive Chairman  of the Board Executive Committee, he led the planning, building, and operation of the University of Central Asia (UCA), a regional institution founded by the Presidents of Kazakhstan, Kyrgyzstan, Tajikistan and His Highness the Aga Khan with campuses in the mountain areas of the three countries. He was the Diplomatic Representative of the Aga Khan Development Network in the Kyrgyz Republic from 2014-2017.
He is currently Senior Advisor, Aga Khan Foundation Canada, in which capacity he is Chairman of the Board of Trustees of the University of Central Asia and advises the Foundation on its work in Central and South Asia as well as Eastern Africa.

Shamsh's academic career began as Founding President of the Aga Khan University (AKU), the first university to be chartered in the private sector in South Asia. As President, he guided this world-renowned institution for 27 years in eight countries of Asia, Africa, and the United Kingdom. During this period, he forged academic partnerships  with several renowned universities including McGill, Toronto, McMaster, British Columbia, Alberta, Harvard and Oxford for AKU. He also led the University's fundraising campaigns, generating over $350 million from private donors, corporations, foundations, and aid agencies.

He has chaired or served on government commissions and boards of business, professional and research organizations in such diverse fields as government reforms, public sector pay and pensions reforms, higher education reforms, school education, health, finance, banking, energy, environmental protection and climate change.
Shamsh Kassim-Lakha was Pakistan's Federal Minister for Education as well as for Science and Technology in 2007-2008. He has played pioneering roles in promoting civil society activities, principal among them as Founding Chair of the Pakistan Centre for Philanthropy (PCP). He sat on the worldwide board of the International Baccalaureate Organization, as well as the Steering Committee of the Talloires Network of over 300 universities involved in civic engagement and based at Tufts University, USA. Shamsh was an honorary member of the Pakistan Business Council, an association of 40 of the largest national and multi-national corporations in Pakistan and chaired its Education Panel. In addition, he has advised and consulted on policy and strategy with selected civil society organizations including the Grameen Bank for their health initiatives, and the World Bank on higher education. He is also a member of the Steering Committee of the Aga Khan Music Awards.

In 1997, Shamsh co-chaired with the Education Minister of Tajikistan the Commission on the Establishment of the University of Central Asia and later helped negotiate the International Treaty and Charter of this institution. During the same period, he chaired the Committee that developed consensus between government, civil society, and industry on key elements of Pakistan's environmental protection laws and wrote the country's National Environment Protection Act (1997). In 2001-2, as Minister of State, he led the government of Pakistan's Task Force on Higher Education Reforms whose recommendations have resulted in major structural changes in universities, creation of the Higher Education Commission (HEC), quadrupling access for students, a thousand-fold rise in funding and a substantial increase in research output. Later, he was appointed a member of the HEC from 2007 to 2011. In September 2018, he was appointed to the Board of Governors of HEC.

Awards and recognition
He has received national awards, Sitara-e-Imtiaz  and  Hilal-e-Imtiaz from the President of Pakistan and Officier de l’Ordre National du Mérite (National Order of Merit (France)) from the President of France, as well as honorary degrees from McMaster University and the Aga Khan University.

Sources

See also
Aga Khan Development Network website
UCA official website

External links
"The future leaders of Central Asia", Devex, 3 February 2017
"Interview: Shamsh Kassim-Lakha" Open Central Asia Magazine, 27 October 2016
"Speech by Shamsh Kassim-Lakha at UCA's Naryn Campus Inauguration", University of Central Asia, 19 October 2016
"Shamsh Kassim-Lakha: 'Magnanimous Kyrgyz people that created such a great epic as “Manas” have a promising future'", Kabar News, 4 September 2016
"Video: (FULL) WEBCAST: UCA’s Kassim-Lakha's 'Creating Opportunity on the Roof of the World' Lecture (UK)", University of Central Asia, 31 May 2016
"Video: Shamsh Kassim-Lakha, UCA’s Inaugural Campus in Naryn, Kyrgyz Republic", English, BBC News, 27 May 2016
"Video: Shamsh Kassim-Lakha, UCA’s Inaugural Campus in Naryn, Kyrgyz Republic", Kyrgyz, BBC News, 27 May 2016
“Shamsh Kassim-Lakha: Education is Not Instant Coffee” Vecherniy Bishkek, 15 October 2015
"Building Partnerships in Central Asia", Higher School of Economics, 24 July 2015

Pakistani economists
Living people
Recipients of Sitara-i-Imtiaz
Recipients of Hilal-i-Imtiaz
Pakistani people of Gujarati descent
Pakistani Ismailis
Federal ministers of Pakistan
Aga Khan University people
Year of birth missing (living people)
Officers of the Ordre national du Mérite